Each Dawn I Die is a 1939 gangster film directed by William Keighley and starring James Cagney and George Raft. The plot of Each Dawn I Die involves an investigative reporter who is unjustly thrown in jail and befriends a famous gangster. The film was based on the novel of the same name by Jerome Odlum and the supporting cast features Jane Bryan, George Bancroft, Slapsie Maxie Rosenbloom, and Victor Jory.

Plot summary
Frank Ross, a crusading newspaperman on the trail of a crooked district attorney, is framed for manslaughter and sentenced to a maximum 20 years in prison. There, he encounters the notorious Stacey, a lifer who is falsely accused of fatally stabbing a stool pigeon. Though Ross suspects Stacey is actually responsible, he keeps mum. A grateful Stacey agrees to help Ross prove he was framed. They arrange that Stacey be named by Ross in court as guilty of the stool pigeon's death before Stacey escapes the courthouse.

Ross promises to tell no one about the ruse, but antagonizes Stacey by tipping off his old newspaper, so that the courtroom is full of reporters. Realizing that Ross has betrayed him, Stacey escapes court by leaping from a window but makes no effort to find the real culprits responsible for Ross's predicament. Ross, meanwhile, is implicated in the escape and spends five months in solitary confinement, where he is handcuffed to the bars in the dark and fed bread and water once a day. But he repeatedly refuses to implicate Stacy. Later, Ross is promised a chance at parole by the warden if he reforms, but the crooked D. A. has become governor and appointed a crony to head the parole board. Ross's bid for release is turned down, meaning he must wait another five years before he can re-file.

Later, Ross discovers the nickname of the man who framed him: "Polecat." By coincidence, Polecat is currently incarcerated in the same prison. He is a hated jailhouse informant, widely disliked by the inmates. Meanwhile, Stacey, impressed with Ross being a "square guy," decides to go back to prison and force Polecat to confess. Stacey instigates a prison breakout as part of his plan and orders the prisoners to bring him Polecat. The warden is held hostage. As the National Guard successfully quells the escape attempt, the warden witnesses Polecat's confession to framing Ross. Thus, Ross is finally vindicated, Stacey and Polecat are later killed by Guard soldiers, and the governor and head of the parole board are indicted for murder.

Cast

 James Cagney as Frank Ross
 George Raft as "Hood" Stacey
 Jane Bryan as Joyce Conover
 George Bancroft as Warden John Armstrong
 Maxie Rosenbloom as Convict Fargo Red
 Stanley Ridges as Meuller
 Alan Baxter as Carlisle
 Victor Jory as W.J. Grayce
 John Wray as Pete Kassock
 Edward Pawley as Dale
 Willard Robertson as Lang
 Emma Dunn as Mrs. Ross
 Paul Hurst as Garsky
 Louis Jean Heydt as Joe Lassiter
 Joe Downing as Limpy Julien
 Thurston Hall as Jesse Hanley
 William Davidson as Bill Mason
 Clay Clement as Stacey's attorney, Lockhart
 Charles Trowbridge as the Judge
 Harry Cording as Temple

Production

The novel was published in 1938. Film rights were bought by Warners who announced it as a vehicle for James Cagney. Edward G. Robinson was discussed as a possible co-star. Robinson was then replaced by John Garfield and Michael Curtiz was going to direct.

Eventually Curtiz was replaced by William Keighley. Fred MacMurray was going to replace Garfield - as the reporter with Cagney to play the gangster. MacMurray became unavailable so Jeffrey Lynn was tested. Eventually George Raft signed to make the movie. He swapped roles so he played the gangster and Cagney played the reporter.

Each Dawn I Die costars Raft and Cagney in their only movie together as leads. Raft had made an unbilled but memorable appearance in a 1932 Cagney vehicle called Taxi! in which he won a dance contest against Cagney, after which he and Cagney brawl. Raft also very briefly "appeared" in Cagney's boxing drama Winner Take All (1932), in a flashback sequence culled from Raft's 1929 film debut Queen of the Night Clubs starring Texas Guinan.

Reception

Critical
Filmink magazine said "Raft's performance is electric – tightly wound, dialogue trimmed, using his eyes."

Box office
The film was one of Warner Bros most popular films in 1939. According to studio records it earned $1,111,000 domestically and $459,000 foreign.

It led to George Raft being offered a long-term contract by Warner Bros.

References

External links 
 
 Each Dawn I Die at TCMDB
 
 
 Review of film at Variety
 The AFI Catalog of Feature Films:..Each Dawn I Die

1939 films
1939 crime films
1930s prison films
American black-and-white films
American crime films
American prison films
1930s English-language films
Films about journalists
Films about organized crime in the United States
Films directed by William Keighley
Films scored by Max Steiner
Warner Bros. films
1930s American films